Sir John Lavington Bonython (10 September 1875 – 6 November 1960) was a prominent public figure in Adelaide,  known for his work in journalism, business and politics. In association with his father, he became involved in the management of newspapers including The Advertiser; he also served as editor of The Saturday Express and as a journalist. After The Advertiser was sold in 1929 and converted to a public company, he became a director, and for a time vice-chairman; an association that continued until his death. In 1901 he began a long association with the Adelaide City Council, serving as Mayor of Adelaide (1911–1913) and later as Lord Mayor of Adelaide (1927–1930). He was knighted in 1935. The now removed Lavington Bonython Fountain on North Terrace was erected in front of the SA Museum in his honour.

Biography
Born in Adelaide on 10 September 1875, John Lavington Bonython was the eldest son of Sir John Langdon Bonython and his wife Mary Louise Fredericka, née Balthasar. He attended Prince Alfred College in Adelaide, and joined The Advertiser in 1896. During his time with newspapers, he worked on The Advertiser, Chronicle and the Express, serving as the editor of the Saturday Express between 1912 and 1930.

Lavington Bonython became directly involved with the Adelaide City Council when he was elected as a councillor in 1901. He became an alderman in 1907, served as Mayor (1912-1913), and as Lord Mayor (1928-1930). His appointment in 1912 made Bonython the second youngest person to serve as Adelaide's Mayor, and during his time with the council he was noted for his focus on Adelaide's heritage. For much of his period as acting mayor and mayor he was a widower, and his sister, Mrs. H. A. Parsons, performed the role of Mayoress at official functions.

He was knighted in 1935.

Amongst his other activities were a number of positions on company boards, including the Royal Adelaide Hospital, Municipal Tramways Trust, and serving as a director and Vice-Chairman of The Advertiser. In particular, Lavington Bonython was a member of the inaugural board for Minda Inc, remaining with the organisation for 62 years.

Lavington Bonython died on 6 November 1960.

Family
John Lavington Bonython married twice, in total producing six children.

Blanche Ada Bray

On 16 April 1904 he married Blanche Ada Bray, born on 10 November 1881 in Adelaide, only daughter of Sir John Cox Bray and Alice Maude Hornabrook, by whom he had a son and two daughters (John, Elizabeth and Ada). She died in childbirth on 5 November 1908, aged 26.

 John Langdon Bonython AO (1905-1992) was born on 13 January 1905 in Adelaide. He studied at the University of Adelaide, and became a solicitor in 1930. On 18 March 1954, he became the founding Chairman of the first board of directors of Santos. Port Bonython was named in his honour. John Langdon Bonython married Minnie Hope Rutherford in 1926 and had three children.
Elizabeth (Betty) Hornabrook Bonython CBE (1907-2008), later Lady Wilson, was born 25 January 1907 in Adelaide. In 1930 she married lawyer Keith Wilson, who became a prominent South Australian politician. (Wilson was senator for South Australia (1938-1944) and federal member for Sturt (1949-1954, 1955-1966). He was knighted on 1 January 1966.) Their son Ian followed in his father's footsteps, becoming a lawyer, and then member for Sturt for 20 years. Betty was very active in community affairs, and served on the boards of a number of organisations.  In recognition of her activities she was appointed a Member of the Order of the British Empire (MBE) in 1946, and a Commander of the Order (CBE) in 1959.  She turned 100 years old on 25 January 2007, and died on 25 September 2008, aged 101.

Ada Bray Bonython (1908-1965) married Denis Heath in 1930 and the couple moved to England. Ada briefly visited Adelaide in 1951, bringing Jannette, then aged 17, the eldest of her three children. She had two younger children, a boy and a girl.

Jean, Lady Bonython

Four years later, on 11 December 1912, Lavington Bonython married 21-year-old Constance Jean Warren, (later Lady Bonython OBE), with whom he had three children, Warren, Katherine and Kym. Lavington was Mayor of Adelaide at the time, and Jean was widely referred to as "the Baby Mayoress". She was amazingly active and on dozens of committees too numerous to mention here. She had a major stroke in 1970, and in the period between then and her death in 1977, her son Warren wrote her biography: "I'm no lady : the reminiscences of Constance Jean, Lady Bonython, O.B.E. 1891-1977", edited by C. Warren Bonython, Issued in progressive chapter-instalments 1976–1981.

Charles Warren Bonython AO (1916–2012) was a conservationist, author and, before he retired from business in 1966, a chemical engineer. He is best known for his role in the creation of the Heysen Trail, but has made many significant contributions to the conservation of the arid regions of South Australia. He married Cynthia Eyres Young (born 1921) at the Church of the Epiphany, Crafers, on 12 April 1941.
Katherine Downer Bonython (born 1918) married Colin Clark Verco in 1940, with the couple presenting Lavington Bonython with three granddaughters.
Hugh Reskymer (Kym) Bonython AC DFC AFC (KStJ) (15 September 192019 March 2011) lived an active and varied life, fulfilling a wide range of roles, including  working as an ABC Radio broadcaster (1937-1938), RAAF pilot during the Second World War (DFC and AFC), running art galleries in both Sydney and Adelaide, being a strong advocate for the monarchy (representing South Australia as a delegate at the 1998 Constitutional Convention), and serving as a company director and board member on numerous boards. He was also an art dealer, an author of numerous art books and a novel, a jazz entrepreneur, long time promoter of the Rowley Park Speedway (1954–73) in Adelaide and a regular driver of Speedcars, proprietor of a number of record shops, and a concert promoter. In the last role he brought many of the "jazz greats" to Adelaide, and played a major role in negotiating the addition of Adelaide to The Beatles 1964 tour of Australia.

See also
John Langdon Bonython#Family name - contains information about the family name and its history
Bonython

References

External links
John Lavington Bonython, Mayor of Adelaide, a painting by the English born artist George A.J. Webb. c. 1913 Aged 12, 1887
"Eurilla", Mount Lofty, c. 1890 - the residence of Sir William Milne at Mount Lofty. Later the property of Sir Lavington Bonython, and later still, of Kym Bonython. 1905 1890

1875 births
1960 deaths
Mayors and Lord Mayors of Adelaide
People educated at Prince Alfred College
Australian people of Cornish descent
Australian Knights Bachelor
Australian politicians awarded knighthoods
John Lavington